The following is a list of assets owned by Recipe Unlimited Corporation:

Restaurants

 Fresh Restaurants
 Bier Markt
 Burger's Priest
 Casey's
 East Side Mario's
 Elephant & Castle
 Harvey's
 The Keg
 Kelseys Original Roadhouse
 Landing Restaurant Group
 Montana's BBQ & Bar
 New York Fries
 Original Joe's
 Pickle Barrel
 State & Main
 Swiss Chalet
 St-Hubert

Former businesses

 Summit Food Service Distributors Inc. (sold to an investment group and no longer part of Cara as of January 8, 2007)
 Second Cup (sold to Dinecorp Hospitality on November 16, 2006)
 Cara Airport Services Division (sold to Gate Gourmet in 2010) 
 Milestones Restaurants Inc. (sold to Foodtastic in 2021)
 Prime Pubs (sold to Foodtastic in 2022)

See also
 Lists of corporate assets

References

Recipe Unlimited
Assets
Food- and drink-related lists